Mummu is a Babylonian deity.

Mummu may also refer to:
 The Justified Ancients of Mummu, a fictional secret society in The Illuminatus! Trilogy by Robert Shea and Robert Anton Wilson

See also
 Munmu of Silla, king of the Korean kingdom of Silla
Mumu (disambiguation)